Dennis Gonsalves (born 1943) is an American phytopathologist. He has created with his team two virus-resistant papaya cultivars called SunUp and Rainbow, which rescued the papaya sector in Hawaii from the devastating effects of the papaya ringspot virus that hit in the late 1990s.

Life 
Gonsalves was born and raised on a sugar plantation in Kohala, Hawaii. He studied horticulture (BS, 1965) and phytopathology at the University of Hawaii. His doctorate was in 1968 at the University of California, Davis. From 1972 to 1977 he worked at the University of Florida and from 1977 to 2002 at Cornell University, where he became a professor in 1995. Since 2002 he was the director of a USDA research center in Hilo and is now retired and living in Hawaii.

Work 
Gonsalves began his research career at Cornell University working on virus-resistant plants. While on a trip back home to Hawaii, he learned from local farmers that a virus was rapidly making its way toward the Big Island's Puna District, where the majority of the state's papayas were grown. This led to his starting a research program in 1985 that resulted in the creation of a papaya with resistance to the papaya ringspot virus. His work is recognized worldwide and has received several awards.

His Rainbow papaya makes up about 77 percent of the Hawaii's crop. Funded by USAID, he helped develop locally adapted papaya varieties for Venezuela, Jamaica, Brazil, Africa, and Bangladesh.

Awards 
 2002: Humboldt Prize
 2003: The American Society of Plant Biologists (ASPB) Leadership in Science Public Service Award
 2004: USDA Technology Transfer Award
 2007: Agriculture Research Service Science Hall of Fame
 2009: Presidential Distinguished Rank Award
 Lee Hutchison Award for accomplishments in research, mentoring, and outreach to developing countries
 fellow of the American Phytopathological Society

Example Patents 
 December 7, 1999 
 June 30, 2009 
 May 19, 2009 
 May 1, 2007 
 August 1, 2006

References

External links 
 Academic Website
 Short Biography 
 Projects and publications on the ARS website
 Cornell Alliance for Science
 Interview with Road Trip Nation
 Publication List

1943 births
Cornell University faculty
American phytopathologists
Living people
People from Hawaii
University of Hawaiʻi at Mānoa alumni
University of California, Davis alumni